Nizamuddin East is an affluent residential colony in South East Delhi, India. It is located on Mathura Road and is home to Humayun's Tomb, as well as that of Abdul Rahim Khan-I-Khana. There are several other monuments in the area. The colony has 286 houses, including Jaipur Estate, and 32 public parks.

Inside the colony is a small center of the Arya Samaj.

Location

Nizamuddin, named after the 13th century Sufi saint, is a centrally located residential area within the ring road. Set in the backdrop of the spectacular Humayun's tomb, to its north and Khan Khana Tomb to its South.

Notable residents
Hukumat Rai Gandhi, first station master of Nizamuddin Railway Station which caused the founding of the colony and hence the first president of the resident welfare association
Sheila Dikshit, former Chief Minister of Delhi
Navin Chawla, election commissioner
Anjolie Ela Menon, artist
Vasudeo S. Gaitonde, artist
Jatin Das, artist
Nandita Das, actress
B. C. Sanyal, artist
Arpita Singh, artist
Dom Moraes, writer
Leela Naidu, actress
M. S. Gill, member of parliament 
Arun Bhatnagar, retired civil servant
Aman Nath, of the Neemrana Hotels chain
Sandeep Dikshit, former Member of parliament 
Ajay Jadeja, cricket player
Ratna Fabri, Museologist
Dev Benegal, filmmaker
Shyam Benegal, screenwriter
Vinod Mehta, journalist
Mark Tully, BBC journalist
Ajit Bhattacharjea, Indian Express editor
Jawed Habib, Hairstylist and politician
Vikram Seth, Novelist

Transport
The Hazrat Nizamuddin Railway Station.
The Delhi Transport Corporation (DTC) buses are also run to this suburb.

See also
 Nizamuddin West

External links
Map of Nizamuddin East

New Delhi
Neighbourhoods in Delhi
South Delhi district